Kahraicha is a village of Kamsaar in Ghazipur district of Uttar Pradesh, India. The village Raimala also is a lart of Khraicha making it a village of hectares. As of 2011 census the main population of the village lived in an area 12 acres and 165 house holds.

Histrorical Population

References

Towns and villages in Kamsar